Red Rising: Sons of Ares is a six-issue comic book series published by Dynamite Entertainment in 2017. A prequel to the Red Rising science fiction series by Pierce Brown, it was written by Brown and Rik Hoskin, with art by Eli Powell. The series explores the origins of the rebel group "Sons of Ares" from Brown's Red Rising novels.

Plot
In a future where the all-powerful Golds rule the universe at the expense of the lower castes, the course of history is changed when one of their number falls in love with a baseborn Red.

Background
Sons of Ares takes place before the events of Brown's Red Rising novels. Hoskin said of the series:

Brown said, "It's a dream come true to bring the world of Red Rising to comic books, and a real pleasure Jedi-mind melding with Rik in the writing process. Sons of Ares is a story made for new and veteran readers alike."

Publication
Dynamite and Brown announced the Red Rising prequel comic series in July 2016. Brown explained, "It takes place before Darrow’s story begins. It's about the founding of the Sons of Ares and how they began to destroy the society from within." The entire six-issue series was published during 2017.

Collected editions
Red Rising: Sons of Ares

References

2017 comics debuts
Dynamite Entertainment titles
Science fiction comics